The Truce or Treaty of Yam-Zapolsky (Ям-Запольский) or Jam Zapolski, signed on 15 January 1582 between the Polish–Lithuanian Commonwealth and the Tsardom of Russia, was one of the treaties that ended the Livonian War. It followed the successful Livonian campaign of Stephen Báthory, culminating in the siege of Pskov.

The truce was concluded with help of papal legate Antonio Possevino and was signed for the Polish–Lithuanian Commonwealth by King of Poland and Grand Duke of Lithuania Stefan Batory and for Russia by Tsar Ivan the Terrible, and established a ten-year truce.

In the terms of the treaty, Russia renounced its claims to Livonia and Polotsk but conceded no core Russian territories as Batory returned the territories his armies had been occupying (particularly, he gave up on the siege of Pskov and left the town of Velikiye Luki. The truce was extended for twenty years in 1600, when a diplomatic mission to Moscow led by Lew Sapieha concluded negotiations with Tsar Boris Godunov.  The truce was broken when the Poles invaded Muscovy in 1605.

One of the principal negotiators on the Polish side was Krzysztof Warszewicki.

See also
Treaty of Plussa – Russo-Swedish truce
Treaty of Drohiczyn – concerning Riga
List of treaties
Timeline of Polish diplomacy
Timeline of Russian history

References

External links 
 The Struggle for the Dominium Maris Baltici

Livonian War
Yam-Zapolsky
Yam-Zapolsky
Poland–Russia relations
Yam-Zapolsky
Yam-Zapolsky
1582 in Russia
1582 treaties
1580s in the Polish–Lithuanian Commonwealth
Bilateral treaties of Russia